Aziz-ul-Rahman Usmani (also written as Azizur Rahman Usmani; died 1928) was an Indian Sunni Muslim scholar who served as first Grand Mufti of Darul Uloom Deoband. He is best known for his Fatawa Darul Uloom Deoband. His brother was Shabbir Ahmad Usmani.

Biography
Aziz-ul-Rahman Usmani was born in 1275 AH into the Usmani family of Deoband. He graduated from the Darul Uloom Deoband in 1295 AH. His teachers included Muhammad Qasim Nanautawi, Mahmud Hasan Deobandi and Muhammad Yaqub Nanautawi. He was an authorized disciple of Muhammad Rafi-ud-Din in Sufism.

Usmani was appointed the Grand Mufti of the Darul Ifta of Darul Uloom Deoband after its inception and he headed it until 1927 after which he moved to Dabhel. His juristic rulings were compiled in twelve volumes by Zafeeruddin Miftahi and were published between 1962 and 1972 as Fatawa Darul Uloom Deoband.  Muhammad Shafi Deobandi also compiled selected fatawa of Usmani and published them as Aziz al-Fatawa.
According to Syed Mehboob Rizwi, Usmani issued 37,561 fatawa between 1330 and 1346 AH.

Usmani resigned from Darul Uloom Deoband along with Anwar Shah Kashmiri in 1927 and moved to Jamia Islamia Talimuddin (Dabhel) and taught Sahih al-Bukhari there. In Dabhel, his health deteriorated and he returned to Deoband, where he died in 1928. His funeral prayer was led by Sayyid Asghar Hussain Deobandi and he was buried in the Qasmi cemetery of Darul Uloom.

Usmani issued verdicts with the title of Grand Mufti of India, along with the title of Grand Mufti of Darul Uloom Deoband.

References

Bibliography
 
 

Darul Uloom Deoband alumni
Hanafi fiqh scholars
Deobandis
1928 deaths
Academic staff of Darul Uloom Deoband
Students of Mahmud Hasan Deobandi
Usmani family
Academic staff of Jamia Islamia Talimuddin
Burials at Mazar-e-Qasmi